Vanity is a 1935 British comedy film directed by Adrian Brunel and starring Jane Cain, Percy Marmont and John Counsell. The plot concerns a conceited actress, convinced of the general adoration in which she is held, faking her own death in order to gratify herself by observing the depth of grief caused by her demise. However the actual reactions to the "news" prove to be far from what she had expected.

Partial cast
 Jane Cain as Vanity Faire
 Percy Marmont as Jefferson Brown
 H. F. Maltby as Lord Cazalet
 John Counsell as Dick Broderick

Production
The film was a quota quickie production, made at Nettlefold Studios in Walton-on-Thames for distribution by Columbia Pictures. It was based on a play by Ernest Denny. It is now considered to be a lost film.

The film is the only known screen credit of Cain, who went on to achieve a degree of immortality in British culture after being chosen as "the girl with the golden voice", becoming the original voice of the speaking clock in the United Kingdom between 1936 and 1963.

Bibliography
 Low, Rachael. History of the British Film: Filmmaking in 1930s Britain. George Allen & Unwin, 1985 .

External links
 
 Vanity at BFI Film & TV Database

1935 films
1935 comedy films
British comedy films
British black-and-white films
Films directed by Adrian Brunel
Lost British films
Films shot at Nettlefold Studios
Films set in London
British films based on plays
1935 lost films
Lost comedy films
1930s English-language films
1930s British films